The Brighouse Bridge crosses the River Calder in Brighouse, West Yorkshire, England. It was built in 1825 as part of the Halifax and Huddersfield Turnpike.

History
The Halifax and Huddersfield Turnpike Act of 1823 allowed for the building of Calder Bridge (now called Brighouse Bridge) on what was to become the A641 road; tolls were abolished on the bridge in 1875 and extensive widening work was undertaken in 1905 and 1999 (both of these latter dates being commemorated in dedication stones on the bridge).

References

See also
List of crossings of the River Calder

Bridges over the River Calder
Bridges completed in 1825
Bridges in West Yorkshire
Brighouse
Former toll bridges in England